The forint (sign Ft; code HUF) is the currency of Hungary. It was formerly divided into 100 fillér, but fillér coins are no longer in circulation. The introduction of the forint on 1 August 1946 was a crucial step in the post-World War II stabilisation of the Hungarian economy, and the currency remained relatively stable until the 1980s. Transition to a market economy in the early 1990s adversely affected the value of the forint; inflation peaked at 35% in 1991. Between 2001 and 2022, inflation was in single digits, and the forint has been declared fully convertible. In May 2022, inflation reached 10.7% amid the war in Ukraine and economic uncertainty. As a member of the European Union, the long-term aim of the Hungarian government may be to replace the forint with the euro, although under the current government there is no target date for adopting the euro.

History

The forint's name comes from the city of Florence, where gold coins called fiorino d'oro were minted from 1252. In Hungary, the florentinus (later forint), also a gold-based currency, was used from 1325 under Charles Robert, with several other countries following Hungary's example.

Between 1868 and 1892, the forint was the name used in Hungarian for the currency of the Austro-Hungarian Empire, known in German as the Gulden. It was subdivided into 100 krajczár (krajcár in modern Hungarian orthography; cf German Kreuzer).

The forint was reintroduced on 1 August 1946, after the pengő was rendered worthless by massive hyperinflation in 1945–46: the highest ever recorded. This was brought about by a mixture of the high demand for reparations from the USSR, Soviet plundering of Hungarian industries, and the holding of Hungary's gold reserves in the United States. The different parties in the government had different plans to solve this problem. To the Independent Smallholders' Party–which had won a large majority in the 1945 Hungarian parliamentary election–as well as the Social Democrats, outside support was essential. However, the Soviet Union and its local supporters in the Hungarian Communist Party were opposed to raising loans in the West, and thus the Communist Party masterminded the procedure using exclusively domestic resources. The Communist plan called for tight limits on personal spending, as well as the concentration of existing stocks in state hands.

The forint replaced the pengő at the theoretical rate of 1 forint =  pengő, thus dropping 29 zeroes from the old currency. (The "B" stood for a long scale "billion", i.e. a million million.) Of more significance was the exchange rate to the adópengő of 1 forint = 200 million adópengő.

Historically, the forint was subdivided into 100 fillér (comparable to a penny), although fillér coins have been rendered useless by inflation and have not been in circulation since 1999. (Since 2000, one forint has typically been worth about half a US cent or slightly less.) The Hungarian abbreviation for forint is Ft, which is written after the number with a space between. The name fillér, the subdivision of all Hungarian currencies since 1925, comes from the German word Vierer which denoted a four-krajcár-piece. The abbreviation for the fillér was f, also written after the number with a space in between.

When the forint was introduced, its value was defined on the basis of 1 kilogram of gold being 13,210 forints. Therefore, given that gold was fixed at US$35 per Troy ounce, one USD was at that time worth 11.74 forints.

After its 1946 introduction, the forint remained stable for the following two decades, but started to lose its purchasing power as the state-socialist economic system (planned economy) lost its competitiveness during the 1970s and 1980s. After the democratic change of 1989–90, the forint saw yearly inflation figures of about 35% for three years, but significant market economy reforms helped stabilize it.

Coins

In 1946, coins were introduced in denominations of 2, 10, 20 fillérs and 1, 2, 5 forints. The silver 5 forint coin was reissued only in the next year; later it was withdrawn from circulation. 5 and 50 fillérs coins were issued in 1948. In 1967, a 5 forint coin was reintroduced, followed by a 10 forint in 1971 and 20 forint in 1982.

In 1992, a new series of coins was introduced in denominations of 1, 2, 5, 10, 20, 50, 100 and (a somewhat different, 500‰ silver) 200 forint. Production of the 2 and 5 fillér coins ceased in 1992, with all fillér coins withdrawn from circulation by 1999. From 1996, a bicolor 100 forint coin was minted to replace the 1992 version, since the latter was considered too big and ugly, and could easily be mistaken for the 20 forint coin.

Silver 200 forint coins were withdrawn in 1998 (as their nominal value was too low compared to their precious metal content); the 1 and 2 forint coins remained legal tender until 29 February 2008. For cash purchases, the total price is now rounded to the nearest multiple of 5 forint (to 0 or to 5). A new 200 forint coin made of base metal alloy was introduced in place of the 200 forint banknote on 15 June 2009.

Banknotes

In 1946, 10 and 100 forint notes were introduced by the Hungarian National Bank. A new series of higher quality banknotes (in denominations of 10, 20 and 100 forints) were introduced in 1947 and 1948. 50 forint notes were added in 1953, 500 forint notes were introduced in 1970, followed by 1,000 forints in 1983, and 5,000 forints in 1991.

A completely redesigned new series of banknotes in denominations of 200, 500, 1,000, 2,000, 5,000, 10,000 and 20,000 forints was introduced gradually between 1997 and 2001. Each banknote depicts a famous Hungarian leader or politician on the obverse and a place or event related to him on the reverse. All of the banknotes are watermarked, contain an embedded vertical security strip and are suitable for visually impaired people. The 1,000 forints and higher denominations are protected by an interwoven holographic security strip. The banknotes are printed by the Hungarian Banknote Printing Corp. in Budapest on paper manufactured by the Diósgyőr Papermill in Miskolc.

Commemorative banknotes have also been issued recently: 1,000 and 2,000 forint notes to commemorate the millennium (in 2000) and a 500-forint note to commemorate the 50th anniversary of the 1956 revolution (in 2006).

The 200-forint banknote was withdrawn from circulation in 2009, as its value inflated over time. The banknote was replaced by a bicolor 200-forint coin featuring the iconic Széchenyi Chain Bridge.

Forgery of forint banknotes is not significant. However, forged 20,000 forint notes printed on the paper of 2,000 forint notes after dissolving the original ink might come up and are not easy to recognize. Another denomination preferred by counterfeiters was the 1,000 forint note until improved security features were added in 2006.

Worn banknotes no longer fit for circulation are withdrawn, destroyed and turned into briquettes which are donated to public benefit (charitable) organizations to be used as heating fuel.

In 2014, a new revised version of the 1997 banknote series was gradually put into circulation beginning with the 10,000 Ft banknote in 2014 and completed with the 500 Ft banknote in 2019.

In 2022 after Russia's invasion of Ukraine, the EUR-HUF exchange rate breached the 400 forint per 1 euro line for the first time. Some time later, the forint also depreciated against the US dollar, breaching the same line.

Current exchange rates

Historic rates
Forints per dollar, euro, etc.

Most traded currencies (from 31 December 1990):

Sources: arfolyam.iridium.hu

Currencies of nearby countries (from 31 December 2010):

Sources: arfolyam.iridium.hu

References

Further reading

External links

Official Daily Exchange Rates Archive, Hungarian National Bank
  bankjegy.szabadsagharcos.org (Hungarian banknote catalog)
  www.numismatics.hu (Roman and Hungarian related numismatic site)
  papirpenz.hu (pictures of Hungarian banknotes)
  Current HUF/EUR and other rates with charts 
  www.eremgyujtok.hu (homepage of the Hungarian Coin Collectors' Society)
 Hungarian banknotes (high resolution pictures, also including old forint banknotes)
 Comprehensive catalog of Hungarian coins
 Hungarian National Bank –  "Information on forint banknotes and their security features, and forint coins"

Industry in Hungary
Currencies introduced in 1946
Currency symbols